Laurie Mougel (born 5 July 1988) is a French alpine ski racer.

She competed at the 2015 World Championships in Beaver Creek, USA, where she placed 17th in the slalom.

References

External links

1988 births
French female alpine skiers
Living people